March On: A Veterans Travel Guide is a military transition guide and military-veterans historical narrative by Michael Embrich, published by Cannon Publishing. The book garnered acclaim from the military-veterans community, and was a best-seller on Amazon for five weeks.

References

Travel books
Travel guide books
Military history of North America